Willem Cornelis Theodorus Friso de Zeeuw (born 11 January 1952, Rotterdam) is a Dutch jurist, professor and politician.

See also
List of Dutch politicians

References

1952 births
Living people
Academic staff of the Delft University of Technology
Dutch civil servants
Dutch legal scholars
Members of the Provincial-Executive of North Holland
Labour Party (Netherlands) politicians
Politicians from Rotterdam
Vrije Universiteit Amsterdam alumni